Emilio Zocchi (March 5, 1835 – January 10, 1913) was an Italian sculptor.  He is best known for his busts, bas-reliefs and statuettes of classical and Renaissance individuals.

Zocchi was born in Florence to parents of limited means. He studied with Girolamo Torrini, then with Aristodemo Costoli and subsequently with Giovanni Dupré at the Florentine Academy of Fine Arts. One of his first works was a Michelangelo as a young boy. His Young Bacchus won an award at the Vienna Exposition of 1873. He completed the bas-relief of Constantine's vision of the Cross at the entrance to the church of Santa Croce, Florence. He completed monuments to Benjamin Franklin and Vittorio Emanuele II.

Emilio, in turn, was the teacher of his son Arnoldo Zocchi and his cousin Cesare Zocchi. He died in Florence.

References

Mackay, James, The Dictionary of Sculptors in Bronze, Antique Collectors Club,  Woodbridge, Suffolk  1977

1835 births
1913 deaths
Sculptors from Florence
20th-century Italian sculptors
20th-century Italian male artists
19th-century Italian sculptors
Italian male sculptors
19th-century Italian male artists